Magnasound was an Indian record company that specialized in Indian classical music, Indian rock and Indipop.  It was distributed by OMI Music Inc. Shashi Gopal was the managing director of Magnasound.

History 
Shashi Gopal founded Magnasound in 1989 with his wife Kalpana and brother-in-law Madhav Das. The three launched the company with their life savings, which totaled Rs 6 lakhs. In the early 1990s, the company gained a reputation for signing young artists like Daler Mehndi, Baba Sehgal, and Alisha Chinai, as well as acclaimed rock bands Rock Machine and 13AD  Already established artists like A. R. Rahman and Asha Bhosle also released albums for the label. Magnasound began to concentrate more on classical artists. Carnatic vocalist Bombay Jayashri became its flagship classical artist when she signed with Magnasound in 1994. Magnasound was also one of the first Indian labels to concentrate on music videos, taking advantage of the new MTV India channel.

In 2003, the company was declared bankrupt and was defunct.

Bayshore 

After Magnasound wound up in 2003, Madhav launched another label called Bayshore Music before he moved to print and edited a film magazine called South Side, for GV Films.

Notable artists
Alisha Chinai
Baba Sehgal
Bela Shende
Bhitali Das
Bina Mistry
Bombay Jayashri
Hema Sardesai
Mehnaz Hoosein
Raageshwari
Sagarika Mukherjee
Shantanu Mukherjee
Shweta Mohan
Shweta Shetty
Sonu Nigam
Suchitra Krishnamoorti
Suchitra Pillai
Zubeen Garg

References 

Indian record labels
Record labels established in 1989
Record labels disestablished in 2003
Defunct companies of India